The 1944 Randolph Field Ramblers football team was an American football team represented the airmen of the United States Army Air Forces stationed at Randolph Field during the 1944 college football season. Randoph Field was located about 15 miles east-northeast of San Antonio. In their second season under head coach Frank Tritico, the Ramblers compiled a perfect 12–0 record, shut out nine opponents, outscored all opponents by a total of 508 to 19, and were ranked No. 3 in the final AP Poll. Football statistician and historian Dr. L. H. Baker selected Randolph Field as national champions for 1944.

Players (with the positions and prior teams in parentheses) included Glenn Dobbs (back, Tulsa), Bill Dudley (back, Pittsburgh Steelers), Pete Layden (fullback, Texas), F.O. "Dippy" Evans (back, Notre Dame), Bob Cifers (back, Tennessee), Jake Leicht (back, Oregon), Don Looney (end, Pittsburgh Steelers), Jack Russell (end, Baylor), Harold Newman (end, Alabama), Martin Ruby (tackle, Texas A&M), Walt Merrill (tackle, Alabama), Bill Bagwell (guard, Rice), Jack Freeman (guard, Texas), and Ken Holley (center, Holy Cross).

Schedule

Rankings

References

Randolph Field
Randolph Field Ramblers football seasons
College football undefeated seasons
Randolph Field Ramblers football